Jean Paulo Batista de França or simply Jean (born November 21, 1981 in Recife), is a Brazilian left back.

Contract
Atlético Mineiro 21 May 2007 to 31 May 2007

External links
CBF

1981 births
Living people
Brazilian footballers
Brazilian expatriate footballers
Brazilian expatriate sportspeople in Turkey
Expatriate footballers in Turkey
Sport Club do Recife players
Treze Futebol Clube players
CR Vasco da Gama players
Sociedade Esportiva do Gama players
MKE Ankaragücü footballers
Tupi Football Club players
Clube Atlético Mineiro players
Esporte Clube Democrata players
Paysandu Sport Club players
Association football defenders
Sportspeople from Recife